The petroleum industry in Kenya is relatively new in terms of mining and exploration. British firm Tullow Oil began operations in Kenya in 2010 after signing agreements with Africa Oil and Centric Energy, purchasing a 50% interest in five onshore licences. In 2012, the Ngamia-1 exploration well was a success and has since been followed by further exploration in the South Lokichar Basin.

History

The history of oil marketing in Kenya began in 1903 during colonial times. Initially, kerosene was the main import in tins but later gasoline was imported in tins and drums. Royal Dutch Shell established the first depot on the Mombasa Island at Shimanzi.

According to Deloitte in 2013, Kenya has four prospective sedimentary basins: Anza, Lamu, Mandera and the Tertiary Rift. The Lamu basin extends offshore.

Oil is regulated by the Energy Regulation Commission and the Ministry of Mining. Current traders include the National Oil Corporation of Kenya, Shell, Tullow Oil, KenolKobil, MOGAS, Hass, Hashi Energy, Gulf Energy, Olympic, Dalbit Petroleum, Petrocam. In August, 2019. Kenya exported its first crude oil from the port of Mombasa. This is an experimental stage to test the country’s crude oil before full production and exportation which will begin in 2024.

See also
Oil companies in Kenya
National Oil Corporation of Kenya

References

External links
 Deloitte 2013. The Deloitte Guide to Oil and Gas in East Africa. Where potential lies

Kenya
Energy in Kenya
Industry in Kenya